This list of botanical gardens in France is intended to contain all significant botanical gardens and arboretums in France.

Ain
 Arboretum de Cormoranche sur Saône, Cormoranche-sur-Saône
 Parc botanique de la Teyssonnière, Buellas

Aisne
 Arboretum de Craonne, Craonne
 Arboretum de Septmonts, Septmonts
 Arboretum de Vauclair
 Espace Pierres Folles, St Jean des Vignes (Soissons)
 Jardins du Nouveau Monde, Blérancourt

Allier
 Arboretum de Balaine, Villeneuve-sur-Allier
 Arboretum de l'Ile de la Ronde, Saint-Pourçain-sur-Sioule
 Arboretum et parc de la Rigolée, Avermes
 Arboretum Paul Barge, Ferrières-sur-Sichon
 Parc floral et arboré de la Chènevière, Abrest

Alpes-de-Haute-Provence
 Jardin botanique des Cordeliers, Digne-les-Bains
 Jardins de Salagon, Mane

Alpes-Maritimes
 Arboretum du Sarroudier, Le Mas
 Arboretum Marcel Kroenlein, Roure
 Jardin botanique de la Villa Thuret, Antibes
 Jardin botanique exotique de Menton (Jardin botanique exotique du Val Rahmeh), Menton
 Jardin botanique d'Èze, Èze
 Jardin botanique "Les Cèdres", Saint-Jean-Cap-Ferrat
 Jardin botanique La Leonina, Beaulieu-sur-Mer
 Jardin botanique de la Ville de Nice, Nice
 Jardin Serre de la Madone, Menton
 Station d'Acclimatation Botanique, La Colle-sur-Loup

Ardennes
 Arboretum d'Élan, Élan
 Arboretum de Guignicourt-sur-Vence, Guignicourt-sur-Vence
 Arboretum de Matton-Clémency, Matton-et-Clémency
 Arboretum de la Pipe Qui Fume, Bogny-sur-Meuse
 Arboretum de Vendresse, Vendresse
 Jardin botanique de Sedan, Sedan

Ariège
 Les Épines de Lespinet, Foix
 Le Parc aux Bambous, Lapenne

Aube
 Arboretum Saint-Antoine, Ervy-le-Châtel
 Jardin botanique de Marnay-sur-Seine, Marnay-sur-Seine

Aude
 Arboretum du Lampy, Saissac
 Arboretum du Planel, Arques
 Arboretum de Villardebelle, Villardebelle
 Cactuseraie d'Escaïre-Figue, Montolieu
 Épanchoir de Foucaud, Pennautier
 Jardin aux Plantes la Bouichère, Limoux
 Jardin botanique Méditerrannéen, Durban-Corbières

Aveyron
 Jardin botanique d'Aubrac, Saint-Chély-d'Aubrac
 Jardin botanique des Causses, Millau
 Jardin botanique de Saint Xist, Le Clapier

Bas-Rhin
 Jardin botanique du col de Saverne, Saverne
 Jardin botanique de l'Université de Strasbourg, Strasbourg

Bouches-du-Rhône
 Jardin botanique E.M. Heckel, Marseille
 Parc du Mugel, La Ciotat

Calvados
 Jardin botanique de Bayeux, Bayeux
 Jardin botanique de Caen, Caen

Cantal
 Arboretum d'Arpajon-sur-Cère, Arpajon-sur-Cère

Charente
 Arboretum du Chêne-Vert, Chabanais
 Arboretum Jean Aubouin, Combiers
 Sentier botanique de Soyaux, Soyaux

Charente-Maritime
 Conservatoire du Bégonia, Rochefort
 Jardin des plantes de La Rochelle, La Rochelle
 Parc botanique Deau, Saint-André-de-Lidon
 Parc Jardins du Monde, Royan

Cher
 Conservatoire national du Pélargonium, Bourges
 Pépinières Arboretum Adeline, La Chapelle-Montlinard

Corrèze
 Arboretum de Chamberet, Chamberet
 Arboretum de la Tuillère, Ayen
 Arboretum du Massif des Agriers, Eygurande  
 Arboretum du Puy Chabrol, Meymac
 Parc Arboretum de Saint-Setiers, Saint-Setiers

Southern Corsica
 Arboretum des Milelli, Ajaccio

Côte-d'Or
 Jardin botanique de l'Arquebuse, Dijon
 Jardin botanique textile, Flavigny-sur-Ozerain
 Serres de l'Université de Bourgogne, Dijon

Creuse
 Arboretum du Puy de Jaule, La Courtine-le-Trucq
 Arboretum de la Sédelle - Crozant

Deux-Sèvres
 Arboretum du Chemin de la Découverte, Melle

Dordogne
 Arboretum de Podestat, Bergerac
 Arboretum des Pouyouleix, Saint-Jory-de-Chalais
 Jardin botanique d'Alaije, Brantôme
 Jardin botanique des oiseaux, Saint-Barthélemy-de-Bussière
 Jardin de Planbuisson, Le Buisson-de-Cadouin
 Jardin Musée de Limeuil, Limeuil
 Jardins d'Eau, Carsac-Aillac
 Parc botanique de Neuvic, Neuvic-Sur-L'Isle

Doubs
 Jardin botanique de Besançon, Besançon
 Jardin Paléobotanique, Soulce-Cernay

Drôme
 Jardin des Arômes, Nyons

Essonne
 Arboretum de Segrez, Saint-Sulpice-de-Favières
 Arboretum municipal de Verrières-le-Buisson, Verrières-le-Buisson
 Arboretum Vilmorin, Verrières-le-Buisson
 Conservatoire National des Plantes à Parfum, Médicinales, Aromatiques et Industrielles, Milly-la-Forêt
 Parc botanique de Launay, Orsay

Eure
 Arboretum d'Harcourt, Harcourt

Finistère
 Arboretum du Cranou, Saint-Eloy
 Poërop Arboretum, Huelgoat
 Conservatoire botanique national de Brest, Brest
 Jardin botanique de l'Hôpital d'Instruction des Armées Clermont-Tonnerre, Brest
 Jardin botanique des Montagnes Noires, Spezet
 Jardin Exotique de Roscoff, Roscoff
 Jardin Georges Delaselle, Île de Batz
 Parc botanique de Cornouaille, Combrit
 Parc botanique de Suscinio, Morlaix

Gard
 Arboretum de Cazebonne, Alzon
 Arboretum de la Foux, Le Vigan
 Arboretum de l'Hort de Dieu, Le Vigan
 Arboretum de Puéchagut, Bréau-et-Salagosse
 Arboretum de Saint-Sauveur-des-Pourcils, Saint-Sauveur-Camprieu
 Arboretum Sainte-Anastasie, Sainte-Anastasie
 Bambouseraie de Prafrance, Anduze
 Jardins ethnobotaniques de la Gardie, Rousson
 Parc botanique de la Tour Vieille, Alès

Gers
 Jardins de Coursiana, La Romieu
 Nature et Paysages (Jardin Carnivore), Peyrusse-Massas

Gironde
 Jardin botanique de Bordeaux, Bordeaux
 Jardin botanique de la Bastide, Bordeaux
 Jardin botanique de Talence, Talence
Château de Mongenan in Portets

Guadeloupe
 Jardin botanique de Deshaies, Deshaies
 Jardin exotique du Fort Napoléon, Terre-de-Haut

French Guiana
 Jardin botanique de Cayenne, Cayenne

Hautes-Alpes
 Arboretum Robert Ruffier-Lanche, Saint-Martin-d'Hères
 Conservatoire botanique national alpin de Gap-Charance, Gap
 Jardin botanique alpin du Lautaret, Villar-d'Arêne

Haute-Garonne
 Arboretum de Jouéou, Bagnères-de-Luchon
 Arboretum de Cardeilhac, Cardeilhac
 Jardin botanique de Toulouse, Toulouse
 Jardin botanique Henri Gaussen, Toulouse
 Jardin botanique pyrénéen de Melles, Melles

Haute-Loire
 Arboretum de l'Hermet, Riotord
 Arboretum de Charvols, Malvières
 Jardin botanique montagnard, Mazet-Saint-Voy

Haute-Marne
 Arboretum de Montmorency, Bourbonne-les-Bains

Hautes-Pyrénées
 Arboretum de Tournay, Tournay
 Conservatoire botanique Pyrénéen, Bagnères-de-Bigorre
 Jardin botanique du Tourmalet, Barèges

Haute-Saône
 Arboretum de la Cude, Mailleroncourt-Charette
 Arboretum du Ru de Rôge, Fougerolles
 Parc botanique du Château d'Ouge, Ouge
 Parc de l'Étang, Battrans

Haute-Savoie
 Arboretum de Ripaille, Thonon-les-Bains
 Jaÿsinia, Samoëns

Haute-Vienne
 Arboretum de la Jonchère, La Jonchère-Saint-Maurice
 Jardin botanique de l'Evêché (Jardin botanique de Limoges), Limoges

Haut-Rhin
 Parc Zoologique et Botanique de Mulhouse, Mulhouse

Hauts-de-Seine
 Arboretum de la Vallée-aux-Loups, Châtenay-Malabry

Hérault
 Arboretum du Figuier, Nézignan-l'Évêque
 Arboretum du Grenouillet, Gorniès
 Arboretum du Mas du Rouquet, Pégairolles-de-l'Escalette
 Cactus Park, Bessan
 Jardin botanique de la Font de Bézombes, Saint-André-de-Sangonis
 Jardin botanique du Puech, Le Puech
 Jardin des plantes de Montpellier, Montpellier
 La Serre Amazonienne, Montpellier

Ille-et-Vilaine
 Jardin botanique de l'Université de Rennes, Rennes
 Jardin botanique du Thabor, Rennes
 Jardin botanique de Haute-Bretagne, Le Châtellier

Indre-et-Loire
 Arboretum de la Petite Loiterie, Monthodon
 Jardin botanique de Tours, Tours
 Parcours botanique au fil de l'Indre, Montbazon

Isère
 Arboretum Robert Ruffier-Lanche, Grenoble-Saint-Martin-d'Hères
 Arboretum de Combe Noire, La Mure
 Arboretum du Val d'Ainan, Saint-Geoire-en-Valdaine

Jura
 Arboretum de Chevreuil, Supt
 Espace botanique du Frasnois, Le Frasnois

Loire
 Arboretum des Grands Murcins, Arcon
 Jardin botanique de Saint-Chamond, Saint-Chamond

Loire-Atlantique
 Jardin des plantes de Nantes, Nantes

Loiret
 Arboretum national des Barres, Nogent-sur-Vernisson
 Arboretum des Grandes Bruyères, Ingrannes
 Arboretum des Prés des Culands, Meung-sur-Loire

Loir-et-Cher
 Arboretum de la Fosse, Fontaine-les-Coteaux
 Parc botanique de la Fosse, Fontaine-les-Coteaux
 Parc botanique du Prieuré d'Orchaise, Orchaise

Lozère
 Arboretum Curie (Arboretum du Col des Trois Soeurs), La Panouse
 Arboretum de Born, Le Born

Maine-et-Loire
 Arboretum Gaston Allard, Angers
 Camifolia, Chemillé
 Jardin des Plantes d'Angers, Angers
 Jardin botanique de Briollay, Briollay
 Jardin botanique de la Faculté de Pharmacie d'Angers, Angers
 Parc Oriental de Maulévrier, Maulévrier
 Terra Botanica, Angers

Manche
 Jardin botanique de la Roche Fauconnière, Cherbourg
 Jardin botanique du Château de Vauville, Vauville

Marne
 Jardin botanique de la Presle, Nanteuil-la-Forêt

Martinique
 Balata Garden, Fort-de-France

Mayenne
 Arboretum de Montsûrs, Montsûrs
 Jardin botanique de la Perrine, Laval

Meurthe-et-Moselle
 Arboretum de Bellefontaine, Champigneulles
 Arboretum d'Amance, Champenoux
 Arboretum de l'Abiétinée, Malzéville
 Arboretum de la Sivrite, Vandœuvre-lès-Nancy
 Jardin botanique du Montet, Villers-lès-Nancy
 Jardin Dominique Alexandre Godron, Nancy

Meuse
 Arboretum du Petit-Bois, Montfaucon d'Argonne
 Arboretum de Varennes-en-Argonne, Varennes-en-Argonne
 Arboretum de Vaucouleurs

Morbihan
 Arboretum de Camors, Camors
 Jardin botanique Yves Rocher de La Gacilly, La Gacilly
 Zoo and Botanical Garden of Branféré, Le Guerno
 Parc botanique de Kerbihan, Hennebont

Moselle
 Jardin botanique de Metz, Montigny-lès-Metz

Nièvre
 Herbularium du Morvan, Saint-Brisson

Nord
 Arboretum de l'Étang David, Locquignol
 Jardin botanique de la Faculté de Pharmacie, Lille
 Jardin botanique de Tourcoing, Tourcoing
 Jardin botanique du Val d'Yser, Quaëdypre
 Jardin botanique Nicolas Boulay, Lille
 Jardin des Plantes de Lille, Lille
 Jardin des Plantes Sauvages du Conservatoire botanique national de Bailleul, Bailleul
 Parc Arboretum du Manoir aux Loups, Halluin

Orne
 Arboretum de l'Étoile des Andaines, Champsecret
 Arboretum de Boiscorde, Rémalard

Paris
 Arboretum de l'École du Breuil
 Jardin Botanique, Université Paris V
 Jardin botanique de la Ville de Paris
 Jardin des Plantes
 Jardin des Serres d'Auteuil

Pas-de-Calais
 Arboretum de Boulogne, Boulogne-sur-Mer
 Arboretum d'Olhain, Fresnicourt-le-Dolmen
 Arboretum de Tigny-Noyelle, Tigny-Noyelle
 Jardin botanique Floralpina, Arras

Puy-de-Dôme
 Arboretum de Royat, Royat
 Jardin botanique d'Auvergne (Jardin botanique d'essais de Royat-Charade), Royat
 Jardin botanique de la Charme, Clermont-Ferrand

Pyrénées-Atlantiques
 Jardin botanique de Bayonne (Jardin botanique des Remparts), Bayonne	
 Jardin botanique des Pyrénées occidentales, Saint-Jammes
 Jardin botanique littoral Paul Jovet, Saint-Jean-de-Luz

Pyrénées-Orientales
 Arboretum de Font-Romeu, Font-Romeu
 Arboretum de Saint Guillem, Prats-de-Mollo-la-Preste
 Jardin ethnobotanique d'Eyne, Eyne
 Jardin exotique de Ponteilla, Ponteilla
 Village arboretum de Vernet-les-Bains, Vernet-les-Bains

Réunion
 Conservatoire botanique national de Mascarin, Saint-Leu
 Jardin de l'État, Saint-Denis

Rhône
 Jardin botanique de Lyon (Jardin botanique du Parc de la Tête d'Or), Lyon

Saône-et-Loire
 Arboretum de Pézanin, Dompierre-les-Ormes
 Jardin géo-botanique, Chalon-sur-Saône
 Parc archéologique et botanique de Solutré, Solutré-Pouilly

Sarthe
 Arboretum de la Grand Prée, Le Mans
 Arboretum des Quintes, Laigné-en-Belin
 Arboretum du Rosay, Sablé-sur-Sarthe
 Arboretum Saint-Jean-de-la-Motte, Saint-Jean-de-la-Motte
 Jardin des Plantes du Mans, Le Mans

Savoie
 Jardin botanique de Mont Cenis, Lanslebourg-Mont-Cenis

Seine-Maritime
 Arboretum de Forêt Verte, Houppeville
 Arboretum du parc de Rouelles, Montivilliers
 Le Jardin Jungle Karlostachys, Eu
 Jardin des Plantes de Rouen, Rouen

Seine-Saint-Denis
 Parc Arboretum de Montfermeil, Montfermeil

Somme
 Arboretum de Samara, La Chaussée-Tirancourt
 Jardins de Valloires, Argoules
 Parc et Roseraie du Château de Rambures, Rambures

Tarn
 Arboretum de Calmels, Lacaune
 Jardin botanique Pierre Fabre "La Michonne", Castres
 Jardins des Martels, Giroussens
 Jardin des Paradis, Cordes-sur-Ciel

Val-de-Marne
 Arboretum de l'école du Breuil, Vincennes
 Jardin botanique de l'École nationale vétérinaire d'Alfort, Maisons-Alfort

Val-d'Oise
 Arboretum de La Roche-Guyon, La Roche-Guyon
 Jardin botanique de Sannois des Plantes Médicinales, Sannois

Var
 Arboretum de Gratteloup, Bormes-les-Mimosas
 Arboretum du Ruscas, Bormes-les-Mimosas
 Arboretum du Treps, Collobrières
 Conservatoire botanique national méditerranéen de Porquerolles, Porquerolles
 Domaine d'Orvès, La Valette du Var
 Domaine du Rayol (Parc botanique à Rayol-Canadel-sur-Mer), Rayol-Canadel-sur-Mer
 Jardin d'acclimatation du Mourillon, Toulon
 Jardin d'Oiseaux Tropicaux, La Londe-les-Maures
 Parc du Moulin Blanc, Saint-Zacharie

Vaucluse
 Arboretum du Font de l'Orme, Mérindol
 Harmas de Fabre, Sérignan-du-Comtat

Vendée
 Arboretum de Saint-Avaugourd-des-Landes, Moutiers-les-Mauxfaits
 Arboretum du Puy du Fou, Les Epesses
 Jardin des Olfacties, Coëx

Vienne
 Arboretum de Neuville-de-Poitou, Neuville-de-Poitou
 Jardin botanique et verger de La Bussière, La Bussière
 Jardin botanique universitaire de Poitiers, Mignaloux-Beauvoir
 Jardin des Plantes de Poitiers, Poitiers

Vosges
 Arboretum de Bains-les-Bains, Bains-les-Bains
 Arboretum de Contrexéville, Contrexéville
 Arboretum du col du Haut-Jacques, Bruyères
 Arboretum du Col du Las, La Grande-Fosse
 Arboretum de Fontenoy-le-Château, Fontenoy-le-Château
 Arboretum de la Forêt d'Épinal, Épinal
 Arboretum de Fresse-sur-Moselle, Fresse-sur-Moselle
 Arboretum de la Hutte, Darney
 Arboretum de Mazeley, Mazeley
 Arboretum de Xertigny, Xertigny
 Jardins de Callunes, Ban-de-Sapt
 Jardin botanique de Gondremer, Rambervillers
 Jardin d'altitude du Haut Chitelet, Xonrupt-Longemer

Yonne
 Serres municipales de Sens, Sens

Yvelines
 Arboretum de Grignon, Thiverval-Grignon
 Jardin botanique de l'Institut National, Thiverval-Grignon
 Arboretum de Chèvreloup, Rocquencourt

See also
 List of Remarkable Gardens of France

References and external links
 Guide des jardins botaniques de France et des pays francophones, Le Carrousel, 2000. .
 Jardins Botaniques de France et des Pays Francophones
 Parcs et Jardins de France
 Arboretum liste
 Association des Parcs Botaniques de France (APBF)
 Convention on Biological Diversity: Botanical gardens in France

Footnotes

 
 
France
Botanical gardens